Astatotilapia bloyeti is a species of haplochromine cichlid from the coastal river systems of Tanzania. Reports from other areas of Africa are considered to refer to related species. The IUCN considers it to be endemic to the Pangani River and includes Kenya in its range. This species taxonomic status is uncertain and some authorities place it in the genus Haplochromis while others retain it in Astatotilapia. This taxonomic uncertainty has led the IUCN to classify this species conservation status as Data Deficient. The specific name honours the collector of the type, Capitaine A. Bloyet, chief of the French research station at "Kandôa, Tanzania".

References

bloyeti
Fish described in 1883
Taxobox binomials not recognized by IUCN